Amiskosakahikan 210 is an Indian reserve of the Peter Ballantyne Cree Nation in Saskatchewan. It is 11 kilometres southwest of Creighton.

References

Indian reserves in Saskatchewan
Division No. 10, Saskatchewan
Peter Ballantyne Cree Nation